LynnMall is a shopping centre in New Lynn, a suburb of Auckland, New Zealand.

New Zealand's first shopping centre, LynnMall, has been servicing Auckland's western suburbs for over 50 years. Since opening in 1963, the centre has continued to evolve and in 2015 underwent redevelopment to incorporate an eight-screen cinema complex and an outdoor dining lane. Together with the existing Farmers department store and Countdown supermarket, the centre provides a shopping destination in the developing town centre of New Lynn.

In January 2015, Lynnmall commenced a $36 million expansion, named Brickworks, which included a new cinema, dining precinct and additional stores. In November that year, Brickworks officially opened to the public.

Seven people were injured in a stabbing attack on 3 September 2021 at the mall, one of whom narrowly missed the knife but was still affected. The attacker Ahamed Samsudeen was shot and killed by police.

See also
 List of shopping centres in New Zealand

References

External links
LynnMall website
The Brickworks - LynnMall

Shopping centres in the Auckland Region
Shopping malls established in 1963
Whau Local Board Area
1960s architecture in New Zealand
West Auckland, New Zealand